Landreth Glacier is the steep 2.3 km long and 600 m wide glacier on the southeast side of Imeon Range, Smith Island in the South Shetland Islands, Antarctica, which is draining southeastwards from Mount Foster between the side ridges separating it from Rupite Glacier to the north and Dragoman Glacier to the south, and flowing into Ivan Asen Cove on Bransfield Strait.

The glacier is named after the New Zealander Greg Landreth whose team made the first ascent of the island's summit Mount Foster (2105 m) on 29 January 1996.

Location
Bulgarian mapping in 2009.

See also
 List of glaciers in the Antarctic
 Glaciology

Maps
Chart of South Shetland including Coronation Island, &c. from the exploration of the sloop Dove in the years 1821 and 1822 by George Powell Commander of the same. Scale ca. 1:200000. London: Laurie, 1822.
  L.L. Ivanov. Antarctica: Livingston Island and Greenwich, Robert, Snow and Smith Islands. Scale 1:120000 topographic map. Troyan: Manfred Wörner Foundation, 2010.  (First edition 2009. )
 South Shetland Islands: Smith and Low Islands. Scale 1:150000 topographic map No. 13677. British Antarctic Survey, 2009.
 Antarctic Digital Database (ADD). Scale 1:250000 topographic map of Antarctica. Scientific Committee on Antarctic Research (SCAR). Since 1993, regularly upgraded and updated.
 L.L. Ivanov. Antarctica: Livingston Island and Smith Island. Scale 1:100000 topographic map. Manfred Wörner Foundation, 2017.

References
 Bulgarian Antarctic Gazetteer. Antarctic Place-names Commission. (details in Bulgarian, basic data in English)
 Landreth Glacier SCAR Composite Gazetteer of Antarctica

External links
 Landreth Glacier. Copernix satellite image

Glaciers of Smith Island (South Shetland Islands)
Bulgaria and the Antarctic